Cleveland Force may refer to:
Cleveland Force (1978–1988), a defunct indoor soccer club
Cleveland Crunch, a defunct indoor soccer club which played as the Cleveland Force from 2002 to 2005